The , also called  were large cruiser submarines (Junsen type submarines) of the Imperial Japanese Navy.

Four boats were built between 1926 and 1929. 
These boats, based on the KD2 and U-139 designs, were of a junsen, or cruiser, type with an impressive range of 24,000 nm. Elderly by 1941 they were among the first Japanese submarines converted to supply duty.

  was present during the attack on Pearl Harbor and witnessed the Doolittle raid on Tokyo, before patrolling the Aleutians. Her aft 14 cm gun was then removed to make room for a  daihatsu cargo barge and she started shifting supplies in the Solomon Islands. On 29 January 1943, the New Zealand naval trawlers, Kiwi and Moa rammed and wrecked her in shallow water at Kamimbo Bay, Guadalcanal. Critical codes remained on board and the Japanese command tried unsuccessfully to destroy the boat with submarine and airplane attacks. The US Navy salvaged 200,000 pages of intelligence: code books, charts, manuals, and the ship's log.
  was ambushed off Guadalcanal by PT-59 and PT-44 on 10 December 1942.

Notes

See also
Junsen type submarine
Ha-101-class submarine
Imperial Japanese Army Railways and Shipping Section

Submarine classes
 
Merchant submarines